The Rock Elm Disturbance is an impact crater in Pierce County, Wisconsin, United States, roughly  southwest of Menomonie.  The disturbance is named for Rock Elm, Wisconsin, a nearby town.

Description 

It may be one of several Middle Ordovician meteors that fell roughly simultaneously 469 million years ago, part of a proposed Ordovician meteor event within the continental United States that includes the Decorah crater in Iowa, the Slate Islands crater in Lake Superior, and the Ames crater in Oklahoma.

Crater characteristics 
A raised area at the center of the crater 0.8 km (0.5 mi) wide by 2.4 km (1.5 mi) long suggests that the impact caused a major upheaval of lower-lying rock— breccia and Mount Simon Sandstone, which lies beneath the surface and is much older than the rock layers in the area surrounding it. Additionally, Blue Rock, an exposed portion of faulted Prairie du Chien sandstone lies at the south of the crater's edge, which can be viewed at Nugget Lake County Park.

Discovery of reidite 
While studying the effects of erosion on areas of meteorite impact, researchers from the University of Puerto Rico discovered a rare high-pressure mineral, reidite, at the center of the Rock Elm impact site. Reidite is a dense form of zircon (ZrSiO4) that is formed by the intense heat and pressure as is caused by an impacting meteorite. The reidite found at the Rock Elm structure is the oldest known example of the mineral. It has been found in other impact sites such as the Xiuyan crater in China; the Chesapeake Bay impact crater in Virginia, United States; and the Nordlinger Ries crater in Germany.

References

External links 
 Article from Geotimes.com, March 2004
 Press release from the University of Wisconsin-River Falls
 Craters in Wisconsin
 Aerial exploration of the Rock Elm Crater

Impact craters of the United States
Ordovician impact craters
Landforms of Pierce County, Wisconsin